The Initiative for Interstellar Studies (i4is) is a UK-registered not-for-profit company, whose objectives are education and research into the challenges of Interstellar Travel. It pioneered small-scale laser sail interstellar probes (Project Dragonfly) and missions to interstellar objects (Project Lyra). Several of its principals were involved in the 100 Year Starship winning team originated by NASA and DARPA.

Notable projects and activities 

Project Dragonfly:

i4is has initiated a project working on small interstellar spacecraft, propelled by a laser sail in 2013 under the name of Project Dragonfly. Four student teams worked on concepts for such a mission in 2014 and 2015 in the context of a design competition. The design of the team from the University of California, Santa Barbara, has subsequently been selected as the baseline system architecture for Breakthrough Starshot. A subsequent study, Project Andromeda, has provided input to Breakthrough Starshot prior to its announcement in 2016.

Project Lyra:
In November 2017, i4is launched Project Lyra and proposed a set of mission concepts for reaching the interstellar objects 1I/ʻOumuamua, 2I/Borisov, and yet to be discovered objects. The project has been featured in numerous media outlets.

World Ships:

i4is has published on world ships, large interstellar generation ships and has presented its results at the ESA Interstellar Workshop in 2019 as well as in ESA's Acta Futura journal.  Several of its core team members have previously worked on Icarus Interstellar's Project Hyperion.

Venus astrobiology mission:
Subsequent to the alleged discovery of phosphine in the Venusian atmosphere in 2020, i4is published a study on a dedicated astrobiology mission, based on a fleet of balloons to probe the Venusian atmosphere.

Principium:
The i4is publishes a quarterly newsletter, Principium.

Prominent figures 

The i4is has a number of internationally renowned academics and engineers who have oversight and involvement with its work -
 Freeman Dyson FRS, theoretical physicist and mathematician, professor emeritus Institute for Advanced Study was a member of the Advisory Council of the i4is
 Alan Bond, Managing Director of Reaction Engines Limited, is a consultant to i4is.
 Dr Ian Crawford, Professor of Planetary Science and Astrobiology at the Department of Earth and Planetary Sciences, Birkbeck College, University of London is a member of the Advisory Council of the i4is
 Gregory L. Matloff, professor New York City College of Technology is Chair of the Advisory Council of the i4is.

References

External links 
 British Interplanetary Society website
 Journal of the British Interplanetary Society 
 International  Space University
 20 minutes talk by Chris Welch about The Institute for Interstellar Studies during SpaceUp Stuttgart 2012 (YouTube Video)

Organizations established in 2012
Space advocacy organizations
Space organizations
Interstellar travel
2012 establishments in the United Kingdom